Saint Antoninus of Pamiers (and ) was an early Christian missionary and martyr, called the "Apostle of the Rouergue". His life is dated to the first, second, fourth, and fifth century by various sources since he is often confused with various other venerated Antonini. Today he is revered as the patron saint of Pamiers, Palencia, and Medina del Campo. His historicity and exact identity are in doubt.

Reportedly born at Fredelacum (Pamiers), he converted to Christianity and made a pilgrimage to Rome, where he was ordained. He returned to preach the Gospel in Aquitaine, especially in the border regions of the Rouergue. He is credited with performing many miracles. He was martyred at Vallis Nobilis, now Saint-Antonin-Noble-Val on 2 September, his feast day. His relics ended up at Pamiers and Palencia.

Veneration
Antoninus was venerated from an early date.  Palencia Cathedral is dedicated to him.

According to local tradition, the Cripta de San Antolín at Palencia Cathedral, which supposedly houses his relics, was finished during the mid-seventh century episcopate of Ascaric. A monastery dedicated to him had been built near Foix by the eighth century. It claimed to possess his head and part of his body, brought from Syria by a boat that had navigated the rivers Ariège, Tarn, Garonne, and Aveyron with the aid of an angel. These conflicting traditions suggest that the martyr of Pamiers is the same person as the martyr Antoninus of Syria.

References
Butler, Alban and Burns, Paul (2000). Butler's Lives of the Saints: September. Liturgical Press. .
Englebert, Omer (1994). The Lives of the Saints. Barnes and Noble Publishing. .
Saint Antoninus of Pamiers at New Catholic Dictionary

Ante-Nicene Christian martyrs
People from Pamiers
Converts to Christianity from pagan religions
Gallo-Roman saints
Year of birth unknown
Angelic visionaries